4001 Ptolemaeus, provisional designation , is a Florian asteroid from the inner regions of the asteroid belt, approximately  in diameter. It was discovered on 2 August 1949, by German  astronomer Karl Reinmuth at the Heidelberg-Königstuhl State Observatory in Heidelberg, Germany. In 1991, the International Astronomical Union named the S-type asteroid after Greco-Roman astronomer Ptolemy.

Orbit and classification 

Ptolemaeus is a member of the Flora family, a giant asteroid family and the largest family of stony asteroids in the main-belt. It orbits the Sun in the inner main-belt at a distance of 1.9–2.7 AU once every 3 years and 6 months (1,264 days; semi-major axis of 2.29 AU). Its orbit has an eccentricity of 0.17 and an inclination of 5° with respect to the ecliptic.

On 24 April 1989, Ptolemaeus approached the asteroid 6 Hebe within 5.5 million kilometers at a relative velocity of 3.7 km/s.

Physical characteristics 

In the SMASS classification, Ptolemaeus is a common, stony S-type asteroid, which is in agreement with the overall spectral type for members of the Flora family.

Diameter and albedo 

According to the survey carried out by the NEOWISE mission of NASA's Wide-field Infrared Survey Explorer, Ptolemaeus measures 4.641 kilometers in diameter and its surface has a high albedo of 0.392. Based on a generic magnitude-to-diameter conversion, assuming a Flora-type typical albedo of 0.24, the asteroid measures 5.0 kilometers for an absolute magnitude of 13.7.

Rotation period 

As of 2018, no rotational lightcurve of Ptolemaeus has been obtained from photometric observations. The body's rotation period, poles and shape remain unknown.

Naming 

This minor planet was named after 2nd-century Greco-Roman astronomer Ptolemy (Latin: "Ptolemaeus") by IAU's Minor Planet Names Committee. He is best known for his influential Almagest, a mathematical and astronomical treatise on the apparent motions of the stars and planetary paths. Its ideas dominated astronomy for 1200 years until Copernicus in the early Renaissance. The official naming citation was published by the Minor Planet Center on 21 November 1991.

References

External links 
 Asteroid Lightcurve Database (LCDB), query form (info )
 Dictionary of Minor Planet Names, Google books
 Asteroids and comets rotation curves, CdR – Observatoire de Genève, Raoul Behrend
 Discovery Circumstances: Numbered Minor Planets (1)-(5000) – Minor Planet Center
 
 

004001
004001
Discoveries by Karl Wilhelm Reinmuth
Named minor planets
004001
19490802